Craig Randall II (born April 22, 1996) is an American professional basketball player for the Iowa Wolves of the NBA G League. He played college basketball for the Memphis Tigers and the UT Martin Skyhawks.

High school career
Randall began his high school career at Girard High School, averaging 23.4 points per game as a sophomore. For his junior season he transferred to Medina High School. Randall averaged 20.3 points, 5.1 rebounds and 4.4 assists per game for a team that finished 19–7 and appeared in the Copley Division I district title game. He moved to Arizona before his senior season after his father found a new job and enrolled at Shadow Mountain High School, playing under coach Mike Bibby. Randall scored a season-high 36 points against Copper Canyon High School. He averaged 21.2 points, 5.6 assists, 4.7 rebounds and 2.5 steals per game and led the team to a 23–7 record while earning PrepHoopsArizona.com Division II Player of the Year honors. Randall was rated a three-star recruit and committed to playing college basketball for Memphis.

College career
Randall struggled during his freshman year at Memphis, averaging 2.2 points per game and shooting 18.6 percent from three-point range. He scored 21 points against Savannah State on November 19, 2016. As a sophomore, Randall averaged 5.2 points per game. Following the season, he opted to transfer to Duquesne and sit out a season per NCAA regulations. In January 2019, Randall joined UT Martin as a midseason transfer. He averaged 16.3 points and 3.6 rebounds per game as a junior. As a senior, Randall averaged 12.9 points and 2.7 rebounds per game.

Professional career

Long Island Nets (2021–2022)
After going undrafted in the 2020 NBA draft, Randall had difficulty finding a professional team to sign with overseas due to the COVID-19 pandemic and opted to remain in the U.S. and work on his game.

In October 2021, Randall joined the Long Island Nets of the NBA G League after a successful tryout. On January 5, 2022, he scored 40 points in a win over the College Park Skyhawks, then followed it with another 40-point effort in a loss to the Greensboro Swarm, becoming the first Long Island Nets player to record consecutive 40 point games. On April 11, 2022, he was named the NBA G League Most Improved Player.

Randall joined the Portland Trail Blazers for the 2022 NBA Summer League.

Adelaide 36ers (2022)
On August 8, 2022, Randall signed with the Adelaide 36ers in Australia for the 2022–23 NBL season. On October 3, 2022, he led the 36ers to a preseason win against the Phoenix Suns with his 35 points being the most by an NBL player against an NBA team. The 36ers entered the season with championship expectations but amassed a 3–4 record in their first month. Randall was frequently seen arguing with head coach C. J. Bruton and his teammates during games which created chemistry issues. He was released by the 36ers on November 8, 2022, with the team stating that it was by "mutual consent". At the time of his release, Randall was the 36ers' leading scorer and fourth in the entire NBL with 20.3 points per game. On January 28, 2023, Randall's NBA G League rights were traded from the Long Island Nets to the Iowa Wolves in exchange for Derrick Alston Jr..

Iowa Wolves (2023–present)
On January 28, 2023, Randall's NBA G League rights were traded from the Long Island Nets to the Iowa Wolves in exchange for Derrick Alston Jr.. On February 2, 2023, Randall was acquired by the Iowa Wolves.

Career statistics

College

|-
| style="text-align:left;"| 2015–16
| style="text-align:left;"| Memphis
| 24 || 5 || 7.5 || .278 || .186 || .500 || 1.3 || .5 || .3 || .1 || 2.2
|-
| style="text-align:left;"| 2016–17
| style="text-align:left;"| Memphis
| 32 || 0 || 18.1 || .349 || .288 || .517 || 1.4 || 1.0 || .6 || .2 || 5.2
|-
| style="text-align:left;"| 2017–18
| style="text-align:left;"| Duquesne
| style="text-align:center;" colspan="11"|  Redshirt
|-
| style="text-align:left;"| 2018–19
| style="text-align:left;"| UT Martin
| 12 || 10 || 33.8 || .436 || .344 || .846 || 3.6 || 2.5 || 1.1 || .2 || 16.3
|-
| style="text-align:left;"| 2019–20
| style="text-align:left;"| UT Martin
| 9 || 8 || 27.3 || .383 || .317 || .600 || 2.7 || 2.4 || .8 || .1 || 12.9
|- class="sortbottom"
| style="text-align:center;" colspan="2"| Career
| 77 || 23 || 18.3 || .374 || .296 || .641 || 1.9 || 1.2 || .6 || .1 || 6.9

Personal life
Randall's father L. Craig scored 1,503 career points at Westminster College while his mother Karla played collegiately at Kent State. His brother Lance played college basketball at Thiel College, while his brother Kyle played at Central Michigan before playing professionally in the G League.

References

External links
UT Martin Skyhawks bio
Duquesne Dukes bio
Memphis Tigers bio

1996 births
Living people
American men's basketball players
Basketball players from Youngstown, Ohio
Long Island Nets players
Memphis Tigers men's basketball players
Shooting guards
UT Martin Skyhawks men's basketball players